The XVI Army Corps was a military formation of the Spanish Republican Army that fought in the Spanish Civil War. It had an outstanding performance in the Levante campaign.

History 
It was originally created on August 6, 1937 from the old Asturian II Army Corps. The command fell to José Gállego Aragüés. It participated in the Battle of Santander, during which it suffered such losses that it was dissolved.

In April 1938, the XVI Army Corps was recreated again in the downtown area, with its headquarters in Tarancón. Miguel Palacios Martínez took over the command of the unit. He was soon sent to the Levante front, in support of the republican forces that resisted the nationalist offensive that was trying to take Valencia. The XVI Army Corps was located between the XIII and XIX corps, in the Teruel sector. At the beginning of July it faced a renewed offensive in the Teruel sector, suffering considerable casualties. At the climax of the Battle of Levante, the corps integrated the 39th, 48th and 52nd divisions; after the beginning of the Battle of the Ebro the Levante front stabilized. During the rest of the war, the XVI Corps did not intervene in any relevant military operation.

Command 
Commanders
 Miguel Palacios Martínez;

Commissars
 Antonio Ejarque Pina, of the CNT;

Chiefs of Staff
 Francisco Arderiu Perales;

Organization

References

Bibliography
 
 
 
 
 

Military units and formations established in 1937
Military units and formations disestablished in 1937
Military units and formations established in 1938
Military units and formations disestablished in 1939
Corps of Spain
Military units and formations of the Spanish Civil War
Military history of Spain
Armed Forces of the Second Spanish Republic
1937 establishments in Spain
1937 disestablishments in Spain
1938 establishments in Spain
1939 disestablishments in Spain